Surgeon Rear-Admiral Timothy Blair McLean, CD, CStJ, QHS  (29 September 1910 – 28 June 1982) was the 21st Canadian Surgeon General.

Born in Fairydell, Alberta, Blair McLean was educated at the University of Alberta, where he graduated with a Medical Degree. He also completed post-graduate surgical training “at the U.S. Naval Hospital, San Diego, California” from 1950 to 1952.

He joined the regular force in 1945, was subsequently “appointed Principal Medical Officer of the [Royal Canadian Navy] RCN Hospital at Esquimalt in March 1947.” The following year, “he was appointed Command Medical Officer, Esquimalt.”

McLean returned to school for a short period of time, from 1950 to 1952. The following year Mclean was appointed Deputy Surgeon General (Professional); he succeeded to the position of Surgeon General in 1960.

Surgeon Rear-Admiral McLean died 28 June 1982 at the age of 71.

References

Surgeons General of Canada
Canadian military personnel from Alberta
University of Alberta alumni
People from Sturgeon County
Royal Canadian Navy officers
1910 births
1982 deaths
Royal Canadian Navy personnel of World War II
Naval surgeons
Canadian admirals